G.I. Orange was a British New Wave and pop band, formed in the mid 1980s by the brothers Karl Whitworth (lead vocals and guitar), Simon Whitworth (bass guitar and vocals), and Mark Whitworth (keyboard and vocals), plus Gary Holt (drum and vocals). They had their biggest success in Japan, where they released an album and a number of EPs and singles.

History
The band formed in 1983, and toured the UK supporting Bucks Fizz and David Essex In 1985 the singles "Fight Away the Lover" and "Psychic Magic" were released in Japan and proved popular. The self-titled album, produced by Tim Palmer was released in Japan in 1985, and was successful, reaching the top of the Japanese album chart, and earning a gold disc. The album sold
25 Million copies. In 1986, G.I. Orange toured Japan. G I Orange recently returned to Japan in 2015, to do three live dates in Tokyo for there 30th anniversary.

In 1990, the members of G.I. Orange agreed to go their separate ways to follow individual projects.

Current status
The band members are still active musicians, and have announced plans to reform. Karl Whitworth is, as of 2010, still involved with music, teaching music in Hertfordshire. Simon Whitworth is an author and songwriter, living on the Isle of Wight.

References

1985 in music
English pop music groups
Musical groups established in 1983
Musical groups disestablished in 1990